Horse Island is an uninhabited island in the Summer Isles, in the north west of Scotland.

Once inhabited, the island now only supports a herd of wild goats.

Footnotes

Summer Isles
Former populated places in Scotland
Uninhabited islands of Highland (council area)